John Stafford, 1st Earl of Wiltshire KG, KB (24 November 1427 – 8 May 1473) was an English nobleman, the youngest son of Humphrey Stafford, 1st Duke of Buckingham. In 1461 he was appointed Knight of the Order of the Bath.

Career
He fought on the Yorkist side at the Battle of Hexham in 1464. In 1469, he was made Steward of the Duchy of Cornwall for life. He was made Earl of Wiltshire on 5 January 1470 by King Edward IV, and was briefly arrested under Warwick's government and prevented from attending the Parliament of November 1470 (he was one of six Yorkist nobles not to receive a summons). 

In return for his loyalty he was made Chief Butler of England, and was empowered, with Lord Mountjoy to pardon rebels who surrendered by 7 June that year. He was made a Knight of the Garter in 1472.

Diplomacy
He did act for some time as a diplomat, working with the Earl of Northumberland to deal with ambassadors of James III of Scotland about national grievances.

Personal life
He married Constance Green, daughter of Sir Henry Green of Drayton House Northamptonshire and Margaret de Ros. They only had one child, Edward, who succeeded him as Earl of Wiltshire, although during the latter's minority he was kept as a ward of the King, meaning revenues from his estates were paid to the Crown.

Ancestors

References

1427 births
1473 deaths
Knights of the Bath
Knights of the Garter
Stafford, John
Earls of Wiltshire